Josh Szeps, previously known as Josh Zepps, is an Australian media personality, political satirist, and television presenter.

Szeps has previously hosted Weekend Breakfast on ABC News. He was a founding host for HuffPost Live and his work has included satirical writing and presenting for Australian radio, as well as the hosting of Brink, an American TV series. He also hosted the podcast Point of Inquiry for the Center for Inquiry.

Early life and education 

Szeps is the son of actor Henri Szeps.  He attended Fort Street High School and the University of Technology, Sydney.

Szeps won Australia's highest radio prize for his long-running satirical comedy sketches on Sydney radio.

He changed his last name from "Szeps" to "Zepps" in the United States to avoid pronunciation confusion.

Television 
Szeps was the host and co-executive producer of Australian Idol Backstage, the behind-the-scenes component of the namesake television series.

Beginning in 2008, Szeps was the host and creative producer of the Science Channel's Brink, a news-style TV series which examined breakthroughs in technology and discovery.  The series ended the following year. Later, he was anchor and correspondent on CBS News Productions' Peabody-winning Channel One News.

In 2012, Szeps was a founding host for HuffPost Live. Szeps was also a regular correspondent with Al Roker on the NBC's Today.

He has also appeared on the panel and co-hosted The Project on Network Ten in Australia and the ABC News program Weekend Breakfast.

In January 2019, ABC announced that Szeps would replace Andrew Geoghegan as host of Weekend Breakfast.

Radio 
Over the Summer 2016/2017 period Szeps hosted the National Evenings Show on ABC Local Radio across Australia.

Szeps hosts a podcast tackling societal issues, Uncomfortable Conversations with Josh Szeps.

Since the end of 2021, Szeps has presented ABC Radio Sydney's Afternoons Program, after it was announced that his predecessor, James Valentine, would be moving to the Breakfast slot.

Voice career 

Szeps was cast as the voice of "Olly the Kookaburra", one of three mascots in the Sydney Summer Olympics.  After leaving university in 2000, Szeps was hired as a script assistant on BackBerner, a comedy television series.  He also worked in the production of 2SM and 2GB, two Australian radio stations.  In 2003, Szeps was hired by Mike Carlton of 2UE, a commercial radio station in Sydney, Australia.  Szeps developed a radio soliloquy for 2UE called "John Howard's Diary", in which he made a weekly impersonation of the Australian Prime Minister's thoughts on the past week's events.  Szeps said to The Sydney Morning Herald in 2003 that "if John Howard wasn't in power, it's entirely possible my life would be going in a completely different direction".  After John Howard was defeated in the 2007 Australian federal election, Szeps' radio spoof became "Kevin Rudd's Diary", a satire of the new Prime Minister in the same format.  Szeps was the creator of Never Never Newsreel, a weekly syndicated satirical radio sketch that ran until June 2008.

Personal life
Szeps was married on August 16, 2014, in Concord, New Hampshire, to Sean Joseph Gallerani, now known as Sean Szeps. The couple live in Sydney, Australia with their twins.

References

External links 
 Josh Szeps ABC Profile 
 Josh Zepps Profile at the Science Channel
 

Year of birth missing (living people)
Australian expatriates in the United States
Australian gay actors
Australian podcasters
Australian satirists
Australian television presenters
Australian LGBT broadcasters
Australian LGBT journalists
Living people